Maya Tskitishvili (born 2 June 1974), is a Georgian economist and politician, Vice Prime Minister and Minister of Regional Development and Infrastructure from 2018 to 2021, in the cabinet Mamuka Bakhtadze and Giorgi Gakharia. She briefly served as acting prime minister of Georgia following the resignation of Gakharia.

Born in Tbilisi, then in Soviet Georgia, she got a degree in international economics for the Tbilisi State University and studied International Trade in the University of Economics of Prague and in the Caucasian School of Business. Tskitishvili worked as a manager and director in several companies of the private sector, like Georgian Airways and also was the Head of the Chancellery of the Government until her appointment as a minister.

See also
Cabinet of Georgia

References

1974 births
Living people
Government ministers of Georgia (country)
Women government ministers of Georgia (country)
21st-century women politicians from Georgia (country)
21st-century politicians from Georgia (country)
Politicians from Tbilisi
Tbilisi State University alumni
Prague University of Economics and Business alumni